Pete Costanza (born 1970) is a professional Canadian football coach who is the pass game coordinator and receivers coach for the Toronto Argonauts of the Canadian Football League (CFL).

College career
Costanza played college football as a wide receiver for the William Paterson Pioneers and graduated from William Paterson University in 1994.

Coaching career

Arena football
Costanza began his coaching career as volunteer coach for the New Jersey Red Dogs of the Arena Football League under head coach John Hufnagel. He was an assistant coach for three years there before becoming the offensive coordinator for the Roanoke Steam in 2000 and then the Iowa Barnstormers in 2001. In 2002, he became the head coach for the Columbus Wardogs. He moved to the Albany Conquest in 2003, also as head coach, before joining the Columbus Destroyers in 2004 to serve as both head coach and offensive coordinator. He resigned from his position with the Destroyers in 2005 and re-joined the Conquest on May 24, 2005, where he was named head coach and director of football operations.

Rensselaer Polytechnic Institute
While still coaching in the AF2, Costanza was hired as the defensive backs coach for the RPI Engineers in 2006. He spent two seasons coaching for Rensselaer.

Calgary Stampeders
Costanza first entered the CFL as a receivers coach for the Calgary Stampeders in 2008, as part of John Hufnagel's inaugural staff which reunited the pair after first working together for the New Jersey Red Dogs. In his first year, the Stampeders won the 96th Grey Cup. He continued to work in this position as the Stampeders won championships in 2014 and 2018. On November 27, 2019, it was announced that Costanza and the Stampeders had decided to part ways, although it was reported that he could not be retained due to the newly implemented football operations salary cap imposed by the league.

Winnipeg Blue Bombers
On January 21, 2020, it was announced that Costanza had joined the Winnipeg Blue Bombers to serve as the team's running backs coach. After the league cancelled the 2020 CFL season, the Blue Bombers ended the 2021 season victorious in the 108th Grey Cup game and Costanza won his fourth championship.

Toronto Argonauts
It was announced on January 19, 2022, that Costanza had joined the Toronto Argonauts as their receivers coach and pass game coordinator. In his first year, the Argonauts won the 109th Grey Cup and Costanza won his fifth championship. In the following offseason, he was a finalist for the offensive coordinator position for the Saskatchewan Roughriders.

References

External links
Toronto Argonauts profile

1970 births
Living people
American football wide receivers
Calgary Stampeders coaches
Players of American football from New Jersey
Toronto Argonauts coaches
Winnipeg Blue Bombers coaches